is the ninth studio album by the Japanese rock band Asian Kung-Fu Generation, released on December 5, 2018. The album was released as a regular and a limited edition, the latter containing the Can't Sleep EP as well as a bonus DVD. Prior to the album's release, it was publicly available to stream for 48 hours.

Release 
The album was released on 5 December 2018 in Japan. The album was also available as a limited edition that included mini album CD called Can't Sleep EP. The reason they split the album and released it as bonus because they didn't want people to pay double the amount for separate CDs and listening album for one hour more is too long. Part 2 of their documentary during America tour also included on limited edition.

Two songs from the album were used as theme song, "Kōya o Aruke" for anime film Night Is Short, Walk On Girl and "Hometown" for drama series Cheers to Miki Clinic, while "Sleep" from Can't Sleep EP used for film Startup Girls. To promote the album, the band announced a nationwide tour in Japan set for March to July 2019. The final concert of the tour at Pacifico Yokohama was released on live video Eizo Sakuhin Shu 15. They also toured in London and Paris alongside two additional concerts in London as opening act for Feeder in November 2019.

Track listing

Personnel
Adapted from the album liner notes.

Asian Kung-Fu Generation
 Masafumi Gotoh – vocals, guitars, recording
 Kiyoshi Ijichi – drums
 Kensuke Kita – guitars, vocals
 Takahiro Yamada – bass guitar, vocals

Additional musicians
 Atsushi Horie – vocals, keyboards (Disc2-2)
 Ryosuke Shimomura – mellotron (Disc2-5)
 Ayaka Tatamino – vocals (Disc1-6)

Production
 Greg Calbi – mastering
 Keishiro Iwatani – recording, mixing
 Kenichi Koga – recording, mixing
 Kenichi Nakamura – recording, mixing

Artwork and design
 Yutaka Kimura – design
 Yusuke Nakamura – illustration

Release history

References

External links
Hometown page on Asian Kung-Fu Generation official site

Asian Kung-Fu Generation albums
2018 albums
Japanese-language albums
Sony Music albums